Crush is a game show which aired on USA Network from March to August 2000. The series was also broadcast in Canada on YTV's teen-oriented "Limbo" block. It was hosted by Andrew Krasny and was known as "The show that begs for an answer to the question, "Should friends try love?".

External links

Official Website (via Internet Archive)

2000s American game shows
2000 American television series debuts
2000 American television series endings
USA Network original programming